Placido Carafa, C.R.  (1615 – 31 December 1672) was a Roman Catholic prelate who served as Bishop of Acerra (1662–1672).

Biography
Placido Carafa was born in Naples, Italy in 1615 and ordained a priest in the Congregation of Clerics Regular of the Divine Providence.
On 26 March 1662, he was selected as Bishop of Acerra and confirmed by Pope Alexander VII on 9 April 1663.
He served as Bishop of Acerra until his death on 31 December 1672 in Naples, Italy.

References

External links and additional sources
 (for Chronology of Bishops) 
 (for Chronology of Bishops) 

17th-century Italian Roman Catholic bishops
Bishops appointed by Pope Alexander VII
1615 births
1672 deaths
Clergy from Naples
Theatine bishops
17th-century Neapolitan people